Stary Ertil is a rural locality (a selo) in Shchuchinskoye Rural Settlement, Ertilsky District, Voronezh Oblast, Russia. The population was 376 as of 2010. There are 7 streets.

Geography 
Stary Ertil is located 32 km west of Ertil (the district's administrative centre) by road. Slastyonka is the nearest rural locality.

References 

Rural localities in Ertilsky District